Tunni (also known as Af-Tunni) is a Somali language spoken by the Tunni who reside in the Lower Shebelle, Middle Juba
Lower Juba and part of Bay regions in southern Somalia. The language is typically classified among the Digil group of Somali languages. Tunni is distinct from Somali, with a different phonology and sentence structure.

Notes

References

Omo–Tana languages
Languages of Somalia